Battle of Dorylaeum can refer to:

Battle of Dorylaeum (1097), a battle between crusaders and the Seljuk Turks during the First Crusade
Battle of Dorylaeum (1147), a battle between German crusaders and the Seljuk Turks during the Second Crusade